Ewer Airport is an airport in Joerat, Asmat Regency, South Papua, Indonesia.

References

Airports in South Papua